The Rose of Stamboul is a 1919 German silent comedy film directed by Felix Basch and Arthur Wellin and starring Fritzi Massary, Gustav Botz, and Ernst Pittschau. It is based on the 1916 operetta The Rose of Stamboul.

The film's sets were designed by the art director Ernst Stern.

Cast
Fritzi Massary as Tochter von Pascha Kondja Gül
Felix Basch as Achmed Bei / André Lery
Gustav Botz as Minister Kemal Pascha
Ernst Pittschau as Baron Rangen
Franz Groß as dance master

See also
The Rose of Stamboul (1953 film)

References

Bibliography

External links

Films of the Weimar Republic
German silent feature films
Films directed by Felix Basch
Films directed by Arthur Wellin
German black-and-white films
German comedy films
1919 comedy films
Films based on operettas
Films set in Turkey
Films scored by Leo Fall
Silent comedy films
1910s German films